Monte Penna is a mountain (1,735 m) on the border between Liguria and Emilia-Romagna, northern Italy, part of the Ligurian Apennines. It is included in the Natural Regional Park of the Aveto, and overlooks the Val di Taro; the sources of both the Taro and Ceno Rivers are located in Monte Penna's slope.

The name derives from the ancient Celtic deity Penn, who was believed to reside here by the Ligures.

References

External links
 Val d'Aveto

Mountains of Emilia-Romagna
Mountains of Liguria
Mountains of the Apennines
One-thousanders of Italy